The 12th European Acrobatics Championships was held in Lisbon, Portugal  1–4 November 1991.

Results

Medal table

Participating nations

References

External links
European Union of Gymnastics

European Acrobatics Championships
1991 in gymnastics
1991 in Portuguese sport
Sports competitions in Lisbon
International gymnastics competitions hosted by Portugal
1990s in Lisbon
November 1991 sports events in Europe